The first season of Gilmore Girls, an American dramedy television series, began airing on October 5, 2000 on The WB. The season concluded on May 10, 2001, after 21 episodes. The season originally aired on Thursdays at 8 pm ET before Charmed.

The show was first announced for pick-up by The WB for the 2000–2001 season on May 16, 2000, a month after the original filming of the pilot episode in April in the Toronto suburb of Unionville. On March 20, 2001, The WB announced that the show was renewed for a second season.

Overview
The first season of Gilmore Girls introduces Lorelai Gilmore (Lauren Graham) and her sixteen-year-old daughter, Rory (Alexis Bledel), as well as the fictional Connecticut town of Stars Hollow and its many quirky inhabitants. The central plot point of the season is Rory's acceptance to Chilton, an elite prep school, and Lorelai's need to borrow money from her parents, Emily (Kelly Bishop) and Richard (Edward Herrmann), in order to fund her daughter's education. Lorelai's parents lend her the money, but on one condition: she and Rory must attend dinner at their home in nearby Hartford every Friday night until the loan is repaid.

Lorelai's relationship with her parents is full of animosity. Not long after giving birth to Rory as a teenager, at the age of 16, she left her parents’ home and moved to Stars Hollow to prevent them from imposing their privileged lifestyle on her daughter. Although still loving her a great deal, her parents continue to resent her for this choice. This results in a significant portion of the conflict throughout the season as Lorelai deals with having her parents in her life on a regular basis for the first time since she was a teenager. It also leads to Lorelai feeling distressed by Rory's positive relationship with her grandparents and obvious interest in their way of life.

In the pilot episode, Rory meets Dean Forester (Jared Padalecki), a new student at Stars Hollow High School who has a crush on her. As the season progresses, she grows to have feelings for him, and they begin dating. Their relationship is briefly interrupted after Dean breaks up with her for not knowing how to respond to his stating that he loves her. Rory professes her love for Dean in the season finale, and they resume their relationship.

The season shows Rory as having strong friendships with both longtime friend Lane Kim (Keiko Agena) and fellow Chilton student Paris Geller (Liza Weil). She has been friends with Lane for over a decade, and the two remain close even when Rory changes schools. When Rory first arrives at Chilton, her relationship with Paris is more that of enemies than friends. However, as the season progresses, the two grow closer, eventually forming a begrudging friendship.

Lorelai has no love interest when the series begins, but she soon develops feelings for Rory's English teacher at Chilton, Max Medina (Scott Cohen). They date for several episodes, but break up when Lorelai begins to feel uncomfortable about how accepting Rory is of having Max in their lives. There is a clear attraction between her and Luke Danes (Scott Patterson), the owner of the local diner, but nothing ever comes of it. Lorelai also briefly reunites with Rory's father, Christopher (David Sutcliffe), but turns him down when he asks her to marry him. Lorelai and Max reunite toward the end of the season, and he proposes in the season finale.

Lorelai is close friends with Sookie St. James (Melissa McCarthy), the chef at the inn she manages. The two plan to eventually open their own inn together.

Cast

Main cast 
 Lauren Graham as Lorelai Gilmore, Rory's mother.
 Alexis Bledel as Lorelai "Rory" Gilmore, Lorelai's daughter.
 Melissa McCarthy as Sookie St. James, Lorelai's best friend and co-worker.
 Keiko Agena as Lane Kim, Rory's best friend.
 Yanic Truesdale as Michel Gerard, Sookie and Lorelai's co-worker.
 Scott Patterson as Luke Danes, the owner of the local diner.
 Kelly Bishop as Emily Gilmore, Lorelai's mother and Rory's grandmother.
 Edward Herrmann as Richard Gilmore, Lorelai's father and Rory's grandfather.

Recurring cast
 Jared Padalecki as Dean Forester, Rory's boyfriend.
 Liz Torres as Miss Patty, the owner of the local dance studio.
 Liza Weil as Paris Geller, Rory's classmate and nemesis.
 Sean Gunn as Mick / Kirk Gleason, a resident of Stars Hollow who works many jobs.
 Teal Redmann as Louise Grant, Paris's best friend.
 Shelly Cole as Madeline Lynn, Paris's best friend.
 Jackson Douglas as Jackson Belleville, Sookie's boyfriend.
 Chad Michael Murray as Tristin Dugray, Rory's classmate and secret admirer
 Sally Struthers as Babette Dell, Rory and Lorelai's nextdoor neighbor.
 Michael Winters as Taylor Doose, the owner of the local grocery store.
 Emily Kuroda as Mrs. Kim, Lane's religious mother.
 Scott Cohen as Max Medina, Rory's English teacher and Lorelai's boyfriend.
 Ted Rooney as Morey Dell, Babette's husband and Rory and Lorelai's nextdoor neighbor.
 Lisa Ann Hadley as Rachel, Luke's girlfriend.
 Grant Lee Phillips as Grant, the town troubadour.
 Alex Borstein as Drella, the harp-player at the Independence Inn.
 Mike Gandolfi as Andrew, the owner of the local bookstore.
 Dakin Matthews as Hanlin Charleston, the principal of Rory's school.
 David Sutcliffe as Christopher Hayden, Rory's father and Lorelai's ex-boyfriend.
 Marion Ross as Lorelai 'Trix' Gilmore the First, Richard's mother, Lorelai's grandmother, and Rory's great-grandmother.
 Scout Taylor Compton as Clara Forester, Dean's younger sister.

Crew
The season was produced by Warner Bros., Amy Sherman-Palladino and Gavin Polone and was aired on the WB Network in the United States. The series was created by Amy Sherman-Palladino, who acted as an executive producer. Sherman-Palladino served as the seasons show runner.

Episodes

Reception

DVD release

References

External links
 

Season
2000 American television seasons
2001 American television seasons